USS Nirvana (SP-706), later USS SP-706, was a United States Navy patrol vessel in commission in 1917 and from 1918 to 1919.

Nirvana was built as the civilian motorboat Tarpon II in 1915 by S.O. Hauser at Staten Island, New York. She later was renamed Nirvana.

The U.S. Navy acquired Nirvana from her owner, M. S. Martin, on 21 May 1917 for World War I service as a patrol vessel on the section patrol. She was commissioned as USS Nirvana (SP-706) on 10 August 1917.

Assigned to the 3rd Naval District, Nirvana reported to Fort Lafayette in New York Harbor on 18 August 1917 and patrolled between City Island in the Bronx and Fort Lafayette until decommissioned on 31 December 1917.

Recommissioning on 18 April 1918, Nirvana was renamed USS SP-706. She steamed to Erie, Pennsylvania, arriving there on 10 June 1918, and transferred to the 10th Naval District. She patrolled the Great Lakes through the end of World War I.

Returning to Marine Basin in New York City on 8 December 1918, SP-706 was decommissioned on 20 January 1919 and returned to her owner the same day.

USS Nirvana should not be confused with another patrol vessel in commission from 1917 to 1918 under the name USS Nirvana II (SP-204).

Notes

References

Department of the Navy: Navy History and Heritage Command: Online Library of Selected Images: U.S. Navy Ships: USS Nirvana (SP-706), 1917-1919. Later renamed SP-706. Originally a civilian motor boat, named Nirvana and Tarpon II.
NavSource Online: Section Patrol Craft Photo Archive: Nirvana (SP 706)

Patrol vessels of the United States Navy
World War I patrol vessels of the United States
Ships built in Staten Island
1915 ships